Ohbara Choseichi is a rockfill dam located in Aichi Prefecture in Japan. The dam is used for irrigation and water supply. The catchment area of the dam is 1.9 km2. The dam impounds about 18  ha of land when full and can store 2020 thousand cubic meters of water. The construction of the dam was started on 1977 and completed in 1993.

References

Dams in Aichi Prefecture
1993 establishments in Japan